Wolfgang Plottke (born 31 July 1948) is a German rower who competed for West Germany in the 1972 Summer Olympics.

He was born in Klein Lukow. He competed at the 1970 World Rowing Championships in St. Catharines in the coxless four and won silver. He competed at the 1971 European Rowing Championships and won a bronze medal with the coxless four. At the 1972 Summer Olympics in Munich, he was a crew member of the West German boat that won the bronze medal in the coxless four event.

References 

1948 births
Living people
Olympic rowers of West Germany
Rowers at the 1972 Summer Olympics
Olympic bronze medalists for West Germany
Olympic medalists in rowing
West German male rowers
World Rowing Championships medalists for West Germany
Medalists at the 1972 Summer Olympics
European Rowing Championships medalists